Sir Ralph Denham Rayment Moor,  (31 July 1860 – 14 September 1909) was the first high commissioner of the British Southern Nigeria Protectorate.

Life
Ralph Moor was born on 31 July 1860 at The Lodge, Furneux Pelham, Buntingford, Hertfordshire as son of William Henry Moor (c. 1830 – c. 1863), surgeon, by his wife Sarah Pears. Educated privately, and destined for business, he engaged in 1880–1 as a learner in the tea trade. On 26 October 1882 he entered the Royal Irish Constabulary as a cadet, and becoming in due course a district inspector resigned after involvement in a divorce case on 9 February 1891.

In March 1891 Moor took service under Sir Claude Maxwell MacDonald, the Consul-General of the Oil Rivers Protectorate, as Commandant of Constabulary in the protectorate. In July 1892 he was appointed by the Foreign Office vice-consul for the Oil Rivers district, and from 6 September 1892 to 15 February 1893 acted as commissioner. During January 1896 he served the office of consul, and on 1 February 1896, when the district was formed into the Niger Coast Protectorate, he was made commissioner and consul-general for the territory, and consul for the Cameroons and Fernando Po.

When in 1900 the protectorate passed from the Foreign Office to the Colonial Office, Moor became High Commissioner of Southern Nigeria and laid the foundations of the new administration. During his years as high commissioner slave trade was abolished in the protectorate, replaced by a growing labour market and cash currency. The Anglo-Aro War (November 1901 – March 1902) pacified opposition to British rule, and expanded British influence through several new military posts and new British district headquarters at Bende and Owerri. His health failing, he retired on pension on 1 October 1903. He then allied himself with Sir Alfred Lewis Jones; he gave valuable advice on West African affairs, and aided in the development of the British Cotton Growing Association. He also served on certain committees at the nomination of the secretary of state.

Moor was appointed Companion of the Order of St Michael and St George (CMG) in 1895 and Knight Commander (KCMG) in 1897.

He was found dead in bed at his residence, The Homestead, Barnes, on 14 September 1909; having committed suicide by poison. He was buried at the new Barnes cemetery. The coroner's jury determined that "the poison was deliberately taken whilst temporarily insane after suffering acutely from insomnia", they had heard evidence that Moor had suffered for the last four years on his return from Africa with malarial and backwater fever that induced insomnia.

Family
In 1898, he married Adrienne Shapland (born ca. 1871), the widow of J. Burns.

Notes

References

Further reading

Adiele Afigbo, "Sir Ralph Moor and the Economic Development of Southern Nigeria, 1896–1903", Journal of the Historical Society of Nigeria, 5/3 (1970), 371–97 
Adiele Afigbo, The Warrant Chiefs: Indirect Rule in Southeastern Nigeria, 1891–1929 (1972) 
Robert Home, City of Blood Revisited: A New Look at the Benin Expedition of 1897 (1982) 
Tekena Tamuno, The Evolution of the Nigerian State: The Southern Phase, 1898–1914 (1972)
J. C. Anene, Southern Nigeria in Transition, 1885–1906: Theory and Practice in a Colonial Protectorate (1966)
Obaro Ikime, Merchant Prince of the Niger Delta: The Rise and Fall of Nana Olomu, Last Governor of the Benin River (1968)

1860 births
1909 deaths
People from Furneux Pelham
British colonial governors and administrators in Africa
People from colonial Nigeria
British expatriates in Nigeria
Knights Commander of the Order of St Michael and St George